Pseudophilautus zorro, the Gannoruwa shrub frog is a species of frogs in the family Rhacophoridae. It is endemic to central Sri Lanka.

Its natural habitat is closed-canopy rainforest, but it can also occur in residential gardens with plenty of leaf-litter. It is threatened by habitat loss. Conde et al. have estimated that protecting habitat of this species would cost of order US$200,000.

References

zorro
Endemic fauna of Sri Lanka
Frogs of Sri Lanka
Taxa named by Rohan Pethiyagoda
Amphibians described in 2005
Taxonomy articles created by Polbot